Sedrick Anton Shaw (born November 16, 1973) is a former professional American football running back in the National Football League (NFL) and Canadian Football League (CFL). He played three seasons for the New England Patriots (1997–1998), the Cincinnati Bengals (1999), the Cleveland Browns (1999) and the Saskatchewan Roughriders (2002-2003).

1973 births
Living people
Players of American football from Austin, Texas
American football running backs
Iowa Hawkeyes football players
New England Patriots players
Cincinnati Bengals players
Cleveland Browns players